Helen Scales is a British marine biologist, broadcaster, and writer.

Personal life and education
Helen Scales learnt to scuba dive when she was 16 as part of the Duke of Edinburgh's Award, and from this experience wanted to know more about life underwater.

She studied at St John's College, Cambridge as an undergraduate and holds an M.Sc. in Tropical Coastal Management from the University of Newcastle Upon Tyne. Scales was awarded a Ph.D. from St John's College, Cambridge in 2005; her thesis title was Exploitation of coral reef fish for the live reef fish trade. This was particularly about the humphead wrasse. She was able to identify individual fish through the colour patterns on their heads after filming the fish underwater and so study their movement and behaviour.

Career
Scales worked for several conservation organisations after gaining her doctorate including the World Wide Fund for Nature, TRAFFIC International, the International Union for Conservation of Nature and Natural Resources and Natural England. She was later appointed as a tutor for the University of Cambridge Institute of Continuing Education. Her scientific interests and research focus on marine conservation and the inter-relations between people and oceans, particularly in the context of habitat protection and the international wildlife trade.

Public communication
Her 2009 book Poseidon's Steed, on seahorses, was described by the reviewer for The Economist as "a fascinating book ... Scales ... explains the myth, biology and ecology of what the Victorians called 'queer fish'." while in National Geographic the reviewer called it "a compelling book about seahorses that makes the case not only for these odd fish but also for the entire ocean."

In October 2011, she appeared on BBC Radio 4's The Museum of Curiosity. Her hypothetical donation to this fictional museum was a tank full of seahorses. In 2013 she spoke at a TEDx event, TEDxLSE, at the London School of Economics. In April 2018, she was a judge for the UK finals of the FameLab competition. In 2021 she was a guest on the BBC Radio 4 programme The Life Scientific.

Selected publications
Scales is the author or co-author of scientific publications and book chapters as well as popular science books and magazine articles. These include:

Poseidon's steed : the story of seahorses, from myth to reality  (2009, Gotham Books)
The underwater museum : the submerged sculptures of Jason deCaires Taylor / essays by Carlo McCormick and Helen Scales (2014, Chronicle Books)
Spirals in Time: the secret life and curious afterlife of seashells (2015, Bloomsbury Sigma)
Eye of the Shoal: A Fishwatcher's Guide to Life, the Ocean and Everything (2018, Bloomsbury Sigma)

E. P. Green & H. Hendry (1999) Is CITES an effective tool for monitoring trade in corals? Coral Reefs 18 403–407
Helen Scales, Andrew Balmford and Andrea Manica (2007) Impacts of the live reef fish trade on populations of coral reef fish off northern Borneo. Proceedings of the Royal Society B 274 989–994

References

External links

Year of birth missing (living people)
Living people
Alumni of Newcastle University
Alumni of St John's College, Cambridge
British marine biologists
British women writers
British non-fiction writers
Academics of the Institute of Continuing Education